Harvie Andre,  (July 27, 1940 – October 21, 2012) was a Canadian engineer, businessman, politician and federal Cabinet minister.

Born in Edmonton, Alberta, on July 27, 1940, Andre was educated at the University of Alberta (Chemical ’62, PhD Chemical ’66) and pursued part of his postgraduate studies at the California Institute of Technology before becoming a professor of chemical engineering at the University of Calgary from 1966 to 1972. In the 1972 general election he won a seat in the House of Commons of Canada, where he served as the Progressive Conservative Member of Parliament (MP) for Calgary Centre for twenty-one years.

In opposition, Andre was a vocal opponent of Petro-Canada and the National Energy Program. He also served as the defence critic.

He was appointed to the Cabinet after the 1984 election brought the Tories to power under Brian Mulroney. Andre served as Minister of Supply and Services until 1985 when he became Associate Minister of National Defence. From 1986 to 1989, he was Minister of Consumer and Corporate Affairs and then Minister of Regional Industrial Expansion until 1990. In addition, in 1987 Mulroney gave Andre responsibility for Canada Post Corporation. Andre confronted the Post Office's major labour and cost issues and in the course of two years saw that department go from losses to turn a $98-million profit for the first time in its history.

For the last three years of the Mulroney government, Andre was Government House Leader. He did not run for re-election in the 1993 federal election, and returned to private life.

After leaving politics, Andre was involved in the business world, particularly the energy sector, as president of Cresvard Corporation since 1998, chief executive of Calgary-based Wenzel Downhole Tools and chairman of BowEnergy Resources since 2001. He served on numerous corporate boards of directors.

Andre was married, and had two daughters and one son.

References

External links 

Canadian Encyclopedia
U of A Engineer Magazine Article

1940 births
2012 deaths
Businesspeople from Edmonton
Members of the House of Commons of Canada from Alberta
Members of the King's Privy Council for Canada
Members of the United Church of Canada
Politicians from Edmonton
Progressive Conservative Party of Canada MPs
University of Alberta alumni
20th-century Canadian politicians